

By location
 Lists of fossiliferous stratigraphic units in Africa
 List of fossiliferous stratigraphic units in Antarctica
 Lists of fossiliferous stratigraphic units in Asia
 List of fossiliferous stratigraphic units in the Caribbean
 Lists of fossiliferous stratigraphic units in Europe
 Lists of fossiliferous stratigraphic units in North America
 Lists of fossiliferous stratigraphic units in Canada
 Lists of fossiliferous stratigraphic units in the United States
 Lists of 
 Lists of

By preserved taxon
 List of dinosaur-bearing stratigraphic units
 List of phytosaur-bearing stratigraphic units
 List of plesiosaur-bearing stratigraphic units
 List of pterosaur-bearing stratigraphic units
 List of thalattosuchian-bearing stratigraphic units

See also
List of fossil sites

Stratigraphy

 
fossiliferous stratigraphic
Fossiliferous stratigraphic